Ronald David Wood (born 1 June 1947) is an English rock musician, best known as an official member of the Rolling Stones since 1975, as well as a member of Faces and the Jeff Beck Group.

Wood began his career in 1964, playing guitar with several British rhythm and blues bands in short succession, including the Birds and the Creation.   He joined the Jeff Beck Group in 1967 as a guitarist and bassist, playing on the albums Truth and Beck-Ola.

The group split in 1969, and Wood departed along with lead vocalist Rod Stewart to join former Small Faces members Ronnie Lane, Ian McLagan, and Kenney Jones in a new group named Faces with Wood now primarily on lead guitar. The group found great success in the UK and mainland Europe, though it achieved only cult status in the US. Wood sang and co-wrote the popular title track from their final LP, Ooh La La, released in 1973. He also worked extensively on Stewart's first few solo albums.

As the group began to split, he started several solo projects, eventually recording his first solo LP, I've Got My Own Album to Do, in 1974. The album featured bandmate McLagan as well as former Beatle George Harrison and Keith Richards of the Rolling Stones, a longtime friend of Wood. After the departure of Mick Taylor from the Stones, Richards soon invited Wood to join them; he did so in 1975, initially temporarily, but became an official member in 1976; however, he was not officially inducted as a financial partner until bassist Bill Wyman's departure in 1993.

Besides I've Got My Own Album to Do, Wood has recorded several other solo efforts. Now Look was released in 1975 and peaked at No. 118 on Billboard; he also collaborated with Ronnie Lane for the soundtrack album Mahoney's Last Stand. Wood also released Gimme Some Neck in 1979, which hit No. 45 in the US; 1234 was released in 1981, peaking at No. 164. He released Slide on This in 1992, Not for Beginners came out in 2002. and I Feel Like Playing in 2010. As a member of the Rolling Stones, Wood was inducted into the Rock and Roll Hall of Fame in 1989 and was inducted a second time, as a member of Faces, in 2012.

Music career

1960s
Wood began his career as a professional musician in 1964 as a guitarist with the Birds, a R&B band based in Yiewsley, Middlesex. A popular live act with a considerable fan base, the Birds released several singles in the mid-1960s; Wood wrote or co-wrote nearly half the songs the group recorded.

By 1967 the Birds had disbanded, and Wood briefly took part in a project called Santa Barbara Machine Head which included later Deep Purple co-founder Jon Lord, before joining the Jeff Beck Group as a bassist. Along with vocalist Rod Stewart, Wood did several tours with Beck and recorded two albums: Truth in 1968 and Beck-Ola in 1969. In between Jeff Beck Group projects, Wood also worked with the Creation.

In Wood's radio show on 14 November 2011, both Wood and Alice Cooper claimed that Wood performed the bass on The Crazy World Of Arthur Brown's number one hit "Fire"; however, Polly Marshall's biography of Arthur Brown states that "According to the-faces.com, Ronnie claims he played on the Track Records studio sessions recording Fire, but he must have confused it with the BBC session [of 8 April 1968]." There is no bass guitar on the recording, only bass pedals.

In 1969, after Steve Marriott left the Small Faces, Wood began working with the remaining members of that group, returning to his instrument of choice, the guitar. This line-up, plus Rod Stewart and former Bird Kim Gardner, teamed up with Wood's brother Art Wood in a formation called Quiet Melon, making a handful of recordings in May 1969. After the Jeff Beck Group's fifth US tour in July, Wood and Stewart joined the former Small Faces full-time, and the band's name was changed to Faces. During the summer of 1969, Stewart and Wood also set the template for what would become Faces on An Old Raincoat Won't Ever Let You Down, Stewart's first solo album (known as The Rod Stewart Album in the US). The backing band on the album also included Ian McLagan, Keith Emerson, Micky Waller and guitarists Martin Pugh (of Steamhammer and later Armageddon and 7th Order), and Martin Quittenton (also from Steamhammer).

1970s

In the first half of the 1970s, Faces released four studio albums and were among the top-grossing live acts of the period. Besides his distinctive guitar work, Wood contributed harmonica, vocals, and bass to the band's recordings, and co-wrote many of their songs, including "Stay With Me" and "Ooh La La". He also played on bandmate Stewart's first few solo albums and is co-writer of the Rod Stewart songs "Gasoline Alley" and "Every Picture Tells a Story", as well as several songs on Never a Dull Moment.

In 1972, Wood and Faces bassist Ronnie Lane composed the soundtrack to the film Mahoney's Last Stand; the soundtrack, which was released as an LP in 1976, also features Faces bandmates Ian McLagan and Kenney Jones, along with contributions from Pete Townshend and Ric Grech. Wood also performed with Townshend, Grech, Steve Winwood, Jim Capaldi and Eric Clapton at Clapton's Rainbow Concert in 1973.

In 1973 Wood asked his old friend Mick Taylor, whom he had known since the early 1960s, to help with his first solo album. In December 1973, Wood collaborated with Mick Jagger on the song "It's Only Rock'n Roll (But I Like It)". Eventually, Jagger and Keith Richards also contributed to Wood's solo LP. I've Got My Own Album to Do was released in 1974, having been recorded at Wood's private studio in the basement of The Wick, his home near London.

Following Taylor's departure from the Rolling Stones in December 1974, Wood participated in the band's March 1975 recording sessions for their forthcoming album Black and Blue. Although still a member of Faces, he toured North America with the Rolling Stones in 1975; Faces announced their break-up in December of that year, and Wood was officially declared a member of the Rolling Stones on 23 April 1976.

In the Rolling Stones, Wood plays the slide guitar as Taylor and Brian Jones had done before him, adding both lap steel and pedal steel guitar. In addition, as did his predecessors, Wood exchanges roles on the guitar with Richards, often blurring the boundaries between rhythm and lead, even within a particular song. He also occasionally plays bass guitar, as seen during 1975 concert performances of "Fingerprint File", when Mick Jagger played rhythm guitar and bassist Bill Wyman moved to synthesizer. The Rolling Stones' single "Emotional Rescue" also features Wood on bass. He has been given credit as a co-writer for a dozen songs, including "Dance", "Black Limousine", "One Hit (to the Body)", and "Had It With You".

In 1975, Wood released his second solo album, Now Look; his third, Gimme Some Neck, came out in 1979. To promote it, Wood formed and toured with the New Barbarians, playing 20 concerts in Canada and the US in April/May and the Knebworth Festival in the UK in August.

1980s
Throughout the 1980s, Wood played as an official member of the Rolling Stones; continued his solo career, releasing the album 1234 in 1981; painted; and collaborated with a number of other artists, including Prince, Bob Dylan, David Bowie, Eric Clapton, Bo Diddley, Ringo Starr and Aretha Franklin.

At the 1985 Live Aid Concert in Philadelphia, Wood along with Keith Richards performed in the penultimate set with Bob Dylan. During the performance of "Blowin' in the Wind", one of Dylan's guitar strings broke. Wood gave Dylan his guitar to keep the performance seamless and played air guitar until a stagehand brought him a replacement.

1990s–2010s

Wood was made a fully-fledged partner in the Rolling Stones' financial organisation in 1990. During the 1990s, the Rolling Stones released two studio albums and three concert albums, as well as touring in 1990, 1994–95, and 1997–99.

In addition, Wood released his seventh solo album, Slide on This, in 1992; he toured to promote this album in North America and Japan. His appearance in 1993 with former bandmate Rod Stewart on MTV Unplugged resulted in a hit album titled Unplugged...and Seated; the concert album that Wood released in 1993 from his tour was called Slide on Live: Plugged in and Standing.

Wood also contributed to Bo Diddley's 1996 album A Man Amongst Men, playing slide guitar on the tracks "Hey Baby", "A Man Amongst Men", and "Oops! Bo Diddley", and guitar on "I Can't Stand It".

Since 2000, Wood has continued to combine solo work with his Rolling Stones schedule. After the 2001 release of his album Not For Beginners, Wood toured England and Ireland in 2001 and 2002 with his own group, the Ronnie Wood Band. The band included members of his family, Slash and Andrea Corr. After the tour, a DVD called Far East Man was released.

Wood toured with the Rolling Stones in 2002 and 2003; in 2004, he performed several one-off concerts and guest appearances, including several appearances with Rod Stewart. Later in the year, the two expressed intentions to finish the studio work on a collaborative album, to be titled You Strum and I'll Sing. In 2005, however, Wood was again busy with the Rolling Stones as the band recorded their A Bigger Bang album—although he played on only 10 of the album's 16 tracks. He took part in the accompanying tour, which lasted until August 2007.

In 2005 Wood launched his own record company, Wooden Records, which has released recordings by his daughter Leah, the New Barbarians, and others.

In November 2006, during a break in the Rolling Stones' A Bigger Bang Tour, Wood played guitar on three tracks for British soul artist Beverley Knight's album Music City Soul, released in 2007.

On 9 May 2009, Wood, along with Red Hot Chili Peppers members Anthony Kiedis, Michael "Flea" Balzary, Chad Smith and musician Ivan Neville performed under the name "the Insects" at the fifth annual MusiCares event honouring Kiedis.

On 11 August 2009, Wood joined Pearl Jam on the stage of Shepherd's Bush Empire in London for a performance of "All Along the Watchtower".

On 25 October 2009, Wood, Ian McLagan, and Kenney Jones joined forces for a Faces performance at London's Royal Albert Hall on behalf of the Performing Rights Society's Music Members' Benevolent Fund. Bill Wyman played bass; lead vocals were shared by several performers, notably Mick Hucknall. Rod Stewart, who had earlier denied rumours of plans for a Faces reunion in 2009, was not present.

On 2 November 2009, Wood was given an "Outstanding Contribution" award at the Classic Rock Roll of Honour ceremony in London. Pete Townshend presented the award.

Since 9 April 2010, Wood has presented his own radio show on Absolute Radio. Airing on Saturday night at 10 pm, the one-hour show consists of Wood playing tracks by artists he has worked with and other personal favourites.

In May 2011 Wood won the Sony Radio Personality of the Year award for The Ronnie Wood Show.

Other ventures

Artwork

Wood is a well-known visual artist. When he was a child his drawings were featured on the BBC television programme Sketch Club; he won one of that programme's competitions, an achievement he refers to as his "awakening to art". He went on to train at the Ealing Art College, as had both his brothers. Other notable musicians, Freddie Mercury of Queen and Pete Townshend of the Who, also attended that college in the 1960s.

Wood's paintings, drawings and prints frequently feature icons of popular culture and have been exhibited all over the world. He did the cover artwork to Eric Clapton's 1988 box set Crossroads. Several of his paintings, including a work commissioned by Andrew Lloyd Webber, are displayed at London's Drury Lane Theatre. Art critic Brian Sewell has called Wood "an accomplished and respectable artist"; and the South Bank Show has devoted an entire program to his artwork. Wood has maintained a long-standing relationship with the San Francisco Art Exchange, which first exhibited his work in 1987. Wood is also co-owner (along with sons Jamie and Tyrone) of a London art gallery called Scream.

Books, films and television appearances
To date, Wood has three books to his credit: a short collection of autobiographical anecdotes titled The Works, illustrated with Wood's artwork, co-authored by Bill German and published in 1988; a limited-edition art book titled Wood on Canvas: Every Picture Tells a Story, published in 1998 by Genesis Publications; and his 2007 autobiography Ronnie, written in collaboration with his son-in-law Jack MacDonald and Jeffrey Robinson.

In addition to numerous Faces and Rolling Stones concert films, broadcasts and documentaries, Wood performed alongside the Band, Bob Dylan, and many others in the finale of the documentary The Last Waltz, filmed in 1976. He has made cameo appearances in feature films, including The Deadly Bees (1967), The Wild Life (1984) and 9½ Weeks (1986), as well as on television programs including The Rutles: All You Need Is Cash (1978). In October 2007, Wood appeared on the television motor show Top Gear, achieving a celebrity lap time of 1:49.4.

On 17 October 2017, his autobiography Ronnie Wood: Artist was published.

Thoroughbred racing
Wood has a long-standing interest in thoroughbred breeding and racing. One of his best-known horses, of which he is the breeder, is Sandymount Duke, who has competed in both flat and jump racing under trainer Jessica Harrington. In January 2019, it was announced that Sandymount Duke was being aimed at the Grand National at Aintree racecourse. However, a setback in training prevented the horse from taking its place in the field.

Personal life

Wood was born in Hillingdon, west London, into a family of English "bargees" (river or canal barge operators, sometimes called "water gypsies"). He has said that his generation was the first in the family to be born on dry land. He grew up in Yiewsley and attended St Stephen's Infant School, St Matthew's Church of England Primary School and St Martin's C of E Secondary Modern School West Drayton.

His elder brothers, Art and Ted, were graphic artists as well as musicians; Ted Wood died in 2004 and Art Wood in 2006.

Wood has six children. Jesse is his son with his first wife, Krissy (née Findlay), a former model to whom he was married from 1971 to 1978. During this time he had an affair with George Harrison's former wife, Pattie Boyd. Findlay died in 2005. In 1985 Wood married his second wife, Jo Wood (née Karslake), mother of his daughter Leah and son Tyrone. He also adopted Jamie, Jo Wood's son from a previous relationship. In addition to his six children, Wood has six grandchildren.

Wood has been frank about his struggle with alcoholism; although reports between 2003 and 2006 had indicated that he had been sober since the Rolling Stones' 2002–03 tour, in June 2006 it was reported that he was entering rehab following a spell of increased alcohol abuse. By July 2008, ITN reported that Wood had checked himself into rehab a total of six times, the last time being before the wedding of his daughter, Leah. He had plans once again for a seventh admission. Wood also took up stamp collecting as part of his alcoholism rehab.

In July 2008 he left his wife for Katia Ivanova, whom he had met in a London club. Wood checked into rehab again on 16 July 2008. Jo Wood filed for divorce, which was granted in 2009.

On 3 December 2009, Wood was arrested over assault "in connection with a domestic incident". He was cautioned for this offence on 22 December 2009.

On 21 December 2012, Wood married Sally Humphreys, the owner of a theatre production company, 31 years his junior. Their twin girls, named Gracie Jane and Alice Rose, were born on Monday 30 May 2016, just before Ronnie Wood's 69th birthday on 1 June 2016.

Wood was diagnosed with lung cancer in 2017, necessitating the partial removal of one of his lungs. He said he refused chemotherapy because he did not want to lose his hair. In April 2021, Wood announced that he had been diagnosed with a small-cell cancer but that he had been deemed "all-clear" by his doctors following treatment.

In 2021, Wood stated that he had been sober for 10 years.

He is a fan of English EFL Championship football club West Bromwich Albion.

Discography

Studio albums
I've Got My Own Album to Do (1974/Warner Bros.)
Now Look (1975/Warner Bros.) US No. 118
Gimme Some Neck (1979/Columbia) US No. 45
1234 (1981/Columbia) US No. 164
Slide on This (1992/Continuum)
Not for Beginners (2001/SPV)
I Feel Like Playing (2010/Eagle) UK No. 164

Original soundtrack album

 Mahoney's Last Stand (1976/Warner Bros.) with Ronnie Lane

Live albums
Live at the Ritz (1988/Victor) with Bo Diddley
Slide on Live: Plugged in and Standing (1993/Continuum)
Live and Eclectic (2000/SPV) (reissued in 2002 as Live at Electric Ladyland)
Buried Alive: Live in Maryland (2006/Wooden) with the New Barbarians
The First Barbarians: Live from Kilburn (2007/Wooden)
Live in London: Ambassadors Theatre (2010/SHProds)
Mad Lad: A Live Tribute to Chuck Berry (2019/BMG)
Mr. Luck – A Tribute to Jimmy Reed: Live at the Royal Albert Hall (2021/BMG)

Compilation
Always Wanted More (2001/SPV)
Ronnie Wood Anthology: The Essential Crossexion (2006/Virgin)

With the Jeff Beck Group
Truth (1968)
Beck-Ola (1969)

With the Faces

Studio albums
First Step (1970)
Long Player (1971)
A Nod Is As Good As a Wink... to a Blind Horse (1971)
Ooh La La (1973)

Live albums
Coast To Coast: Overture And Beginners (1974)

With the Rolling Stones

Studio albums
 Black and Blue (1976/Atlantic)
 Some Girls (1978/Atlantic)
 Emotional Rescue (1980/Atlantic)
 Tattoo You (1981/Atlantic)
 Undercover (1983/Atlantic)
 Dirty Work (1986/Columbia)
 Steel Wheels (1989/Columbia)
 Voodoo Lounge (1994/Virgin)
 Bridges to Babylon (1997/Virgin)
 A Bigger Bang (2005/Virgin)
 Blue & Lonesome (2016/Polydor)

Live albums
 Love You Live (1977/Atlantic)
 Still Life (1982/Atlantic)
 Flashpoint (1991/Virgin)
 Stripped (1995/Virgin)
 No Security (1998/Virgin)
 Live Licks (2004/Virgin)
 Shine a Light (2008/Polydor)

As session musician
An Old Raincoat Won't Ever Let You Down – Rod Stewart (1969)
Barabajagal – Donovan (1969)
Gasoline Alley – Rod Stewart (1970)
Every Picture Tells a Story – Rod Stewart (1971)
Never a Dull Moment – Rod Stewart (1972)
Dark Horse – George Harrison (1974)
Smiler – Rod Stewart (1974)
It's Only Rock 'n Roll – The Rolling Stones (1974) 
Shot of Love – Bob Dylan (1981)
Stop and Smell the Roses – Ringo Starr (1981)
Aretha – Aretha Franklin (1986)
Knocked Out Loaded – Bob Dylan (1986)
Desire – Toyah (1987)
Down in the Groove – Bob Dylan (1988)
Thanks – Ivan Neville (1995)
Deuces Wild – B.B. King (1997)
Music City Soul – Beverley Knight (2007)
11 Past the Hour – Imelda May (2021)

References

External links

 Ronnie Wood.co.uk
 
 —Wood's official YouTube channel, where he interviews rock 'n' roll personalities and occasionally presents video clips of his on-stage performances.
 Scream Gallery
 
 San Francisco Art Exchange

Living people
Alumni of the University of West London
English film score composers
English male film score composers
English rock guitarists
English blues guitarists
English male guitarists
Lead guitarists
Slide guitarists
People from Hillingdon
The Rolling Stones members
1947 births
Weissenborn players
British rhythm and blues boom musicians
British philatelists
English contemporary artists
Pedal steel guitarists
Faces (band) members
Resonator guitarists
Sitar players
British racehorse owners and breeders
The Jeff Beck Group members